"The Simpsons Guy" is the first episode of the thirteenth season of the American animated television series Family Guy, and the 232nd overall episode. It is a 44-minute-long crossover with The Simpsons, and was written by Patrick Meighan and directed by Peter Shin. It originally aired in the United States on September 28, 2014, on Fox, where both The Simpsons and Family Guy have aired since their respective debuts.

In the episode, The Griffins meet The Simpsons for the first time and decide to stay with them after the Griffin family's car is stolen just outside Springfield. After the Griffins get their car back, Peter is taken to court as a representative of the Pawtucket Patriot brewery, his employer, when it is discovered that its ale is an unauthorized copy of Duff Beer.

The idea for a crossover episode was suggested by Family Guy executive producer and former Simpsons writer Richard Appel, and the episode was announced by Fox in July 2013. Five of the six main members of the voice cast of The Simpsons—the exception being Harry Shearer—voiced their characters in the episode. "The Simpsons Guy" was met with a mixed reception by critics, who had differing opinions on how well the two shows combined.

Plot
Peter creates a comic for the Quahog newspaper, but its misogynistic humor angers local women. When an attempt to calm them fails, the Griffin family flees Quahog to escape the angry townspeople. Their car is stolen at a gas station, leaving them stranded outside Springfield. At the Kwik-E-Mart, Homer Simpson introduces himself and takes them to the Springfield Police Department, where they are turned away by Chief Wiggum.

The Simpson family puts up the Griffins in their home. Bart shows Stewie his slingshot, teaches him how to skateboard, and prank calls Moe, and the two become friends. When Nelson Muntz bullies Bart, Stewie tortures Nelson. Lisa tries to find Meg's talent. When she realizes Meg is a natural at the saxophone, she downplays it out of spite. Chris and Brian take Santa's Little Helper for a walk. Brian tries to teach Santa's Little Helper independence, but he runs away. Marge notices Santa's Little Helper is missing, so Chris and Brian fake his presence until he returns. Homer and Peter unsuccessfully try to find Peter's car, discovering it in the possession of Hans Moleman when he accidentally runs Peter over.

The men celebrate at Moe's Tavern, but their relationships sour when Peter introduces Homer to Pawtucket Patriot ale. The drink is revealed to be an imitation of Duff Beer with a new label. Duff, represented by the Blue Haired Lawyer, files a lawsuit against Pawtucket Brewery for patent infringement, with Peter forced to defend the brewery to save Quahog. Fred Flintstone presides over the case. Similar characters from both shows interact with each other. Fred rules in favor of Duff Beer, but declares that both Pawtucket Patriot Ale and Duff Beer are imitations of Bud Rock.

The Griffins prepare to return to Quahog, where Peter faces the prospect of finding a new job. Lisa gives Meg her saxophone, but Peter throws it away, claiming there's no room for more luggage. Stewie points out that he took revenge on all of Bart's enemies: Nelson, Jimbo Jones, Principal Skinner, Sideshow Bob, and, for the sake of making a scatological pun, Apu. Bart is sickened by Stewie's violent tendencies and ends their friendship. Homer tries explaining his actions, but Peter reacts angrily and the two fight. Eventually, they admit their admiration for each other while agreeing to stay a half-hour away in the future, with a pile of garbage in between. Returning home, the Griffins find the heat from Peter's comic has died down and the Pawtucket Brewery is safe when Lois doubts that the inhabitants of Springfield will visit Quahog to enforce the ruling. Stewie pretends he is over Bart, but in his room writes "I will not think about Bart anymore" several times on a chalkboard.

Production

Development

The idea of a crossover with The Simpsons was first suggested while the thirteenth season of Family Guy was being planned out. Executive producer Richard Appel received Family Guy creator Seth MacFarlane's approval and input after brainstorming ideas. Appel then asked for permission from Simpsons executive producers Matt Groening, James L. Brooks and Al Jean to use their characters. This was approved; Appel was previously a writer-producer on The Simpsons for four seasons, and retained his former colleagues' trust. Dan Castellaneta, Julie Kavner, Nancy Cartwright, Yeardley Smith, and Hank Azaria guest star as their Simpsons characters, but Harry Shearer, the final main cast member of The Simpsons, was unavailable due to scheduling conflicts. When asked about how he felt about the crossover, Shearer replied, "Matter and anti-matter."

Family Guy writers pitched several storylines for the crossover, including one in which the Griffins stay with Lenny and Carl and never meet the Simpsons, and another one in which their whole series is revealed to be a figment of Ralph Wiggum's imagination. When the final script was read to the show's staff, Appel expressed his concern about the length of the episode. MacFarlane said that Fox would be happy to make it an hour long. Supervising director Peter Shin, a former layout artist on The Simpsons, spent time adjusting the Griffins to the specifications of Springfield—changes included dimming the whites of their eyeballs so they would not look too bright—and animating the eight-minute fight between Peter and Homer. Appel said there are no plans to do a sequel to the episode, but stated that "by season 43 of The Simpsons and season 27 of Family Guy, someone who's looking at a blank board is going to say, 'Well, the Griffins went to Springfield... what if the Simpsons went to Quahog?' And more heads will explode at Fox."

Announcement and promotion
The episode was first announced by Fox in July 2013 to premiere in the fall of 2014. In May 2014, the network presented two clips from the episode at their annual upfront presentation. In an interview with Entertainment Weekly about the episode, MacFarlane stated that the key to a good crossover episode is "really about the character interaction. People want to see Peter interact with Homer. They want to see Bart interact with Stewie. In a way, the story in a crossover episode, while it has to be there, is never quite as important as how the characters interact with each other." The Simpsons creator Groening added, "In this case, it's two really vivid shows and seeing what they can do together. You want to see them having a good time and you want to see Peter and Homer duke it out".

"The Simpsons Guy" includes cameo appearances by Roger of American Dad!, Bob Belcher of Bob's Burgers, and Fred Flintstone of The Flintstones. The episode also pokes fun at the different characters' skin colors; upon entering Springfield, Peter warns the family not to drink the water because all the citizens appear to have hepatitis, while Homer refers to the Griffin family as "our albino visitors". The Springfield Gorge scene in Homer and Peter's fight sequence is a reference to the finale of the season two episode "Bart the Daredevil" in which Homer inadvertently ends up jumping the Gorge on Bart's skateboard.

Reception
The episode was watched by 8.45 million people. This was slightly more than the second season premiere of Resurrection on ABC but less than The Good Wife on CBS, both shows in the same timeslot. "Clown in the Dumps", the earlier premiere of the twenty-sixth season of The Simpsons was watched by 8.53 million.

Critical reception
"The Simpsons Guy" received mixed reviews. Writing in USA Today, Mike Foss gave the episode a positive review, but criticized how the episode was written by Family Guy staff and thus lacked elements of The Simpsons humor. Jason Hughes of TheWrap was also generally in praise of the episode, but felt that certain scenes—including both Peter and Homer's fight and an erotic car wash sequence—were "squeamish" and out of place for The Simpsons. He, however, acknowledged that Bart's disgust at Stewie's behavior was "a good statement" of the difference between the two shows. Positive reviews of the crossover also came from IGN, the International Business Times, the Standard-Examiner, and TVLine.

Other critics responded negatively. Scott Meslow, of The Week, pointed out his disappointment that the episode parodied a scene in "Bart the Daredevil", as that episode dealt with Homer and Bart's relationship, but "The Simpsons Guy" used it as a joke in a violent sequence. Emily VanDerWerff wrote on Vox that while she expected the episode to be mediocre, it actually ended up a "blight on humanity itself". She listed nine reasons for this statement, including her dissatisfaction with the car wash and fight scenes, and the use of sexist jokes which had lost their shock value. After the episode aired in the United Kingdom in July 2015, Ellen E. Jones, of The Independent, criticized the episode's rape jokes and violence, and theorized that with the poor box-office performance of his latest film Ted 2, audiences were growing tired of MacFarlane's humor. Ed Power of The Daily Telegraph, however, wrote that Family Guys usual objectionable content was restrained in the episode, as if it had been "infected" by recent seasons of The Simpsons.

The A.V. Club named the episode among "The worst TV of 2014" under "Worst crossover", writing that "for no real reason, Homer and Peter find themselves in an interminable 'sexy car wash' montage, sudsing and squirting each other in tied-off tees and denim cutoffs. Family Guy prides itself on cutaway gags, but the car-wash scene... is its most successful look-away gag".

Parents Television Council
"The Simpsons Guy" attracted controversy before it had aired. Tim Winter, the President of the Parents Television Council, a socially conservative media monitoring organization and longtime critic of Family Guy, wrote to Matt Groening, Seth MacFarlane and Fox about a joke seen in the trailer for the episode. In it, after Bart's prank call to Moe asking for a man with an innuendo name, Stewie makes his own call and tells Moe that his sister is being raped. Winter felt that jokes about rape make it "less outrageous in real life", and that people who watch The Simpsons but not Family Guy would be unfamiliar with the latter show's brand of humor. A Fox spokeswoman declined to comment on the joke, while MacFarlane, interviewed by Entertainment Weekly, said that although he would be attacked for stating it as such, the joke was "pretty funny... in context". A spokeswoman from the Rape, Abuse & Incest National Network said "I think the show is making it clear that rape is not funny by how they are positioning the joke."

The Parents Television Council declared the episode worst show of the week, saying that it was significantly distasteful to involve The Simpsons because although that series is rated PG, Family Guy aims "to reach the most extreme and outlandish conclusion of any joke, no matter how harsh the punchline may be. For subjecting viewers to jokes about rape, cartoon nudity, and disturbing acts of violence, Fox's Family Guy will remain the Worst TV Show of the Week".

See also
Night of the Hurricane – a cross-over of all of Seth MacFarlane's programs on Fox.
List of The Simpsons episodes

References

External links

 

2014 American television episodes
Crossover animation
Crossover television
Family Guy (season 13) episodes
Obscenity controversies in animation
Obscenity controversies in television
The Simpsons
Television controversies in the United States
Television crossover episodes